Waterloo Creek is a  tributary of the Upper Iowa River, with a watershed covering . It rises as Bee Creek in Houston County, Minnesota, southwest of the city of Spring Grove, flowing generally in a southeasterly direction, crossing into Waterloo Township in Allamakee County, Iowa, where it becomes Waterloo Creek and takes a generally north–south route to its confluence with Bear Creek, just before entering the Upper Iowa River. Iowa Highway 76 parallels the stream until crossing the river. The town of Dorchester, Iowa is the only settlement alongside it.

The creek is rated as one of the best trout fishing streams in Iowa. In recent years, substantial restoration work on the creek has been accomplished, removing invasive non-native planting and restoring the original meanderings of spring-fed brooks.

See also
List of rivers of Iowa

References

Upper Iowa River statistics (retrieved 31 March 2007)
Environmental Protection Agency (retrieved 31 March 2007)
Iowa Department of Natural Resources (retrieved 31 March 2007)
Trout Unlimited (retrieved 31 March 2007)
Waterloo Township (excellent maps) (retrieved 31 March 2007)
Dorchester, Iowa (retrieved 31 March 2007)
Upper Midwest Flyfishing (retrieved 31 March 2007)
Iowa Department of Transportation (retrieved 31 March 2007)
TopoQuest topographic map (retrieved 5 July 2008)

Tributaries of the Upper Iowa River
Rivers of Iowa
Rivers of Minnesota
Rivers of Allamakee County, Iowa
Rivers of Houston County, Minnesota